Uncial 0287 (in the Gregory-Aland numbering), is a Greek-Arabic  uncial manuscript of the New Testament. Paleographically it has been assigned to the 9th century.

Description 

The codex contains the text of the four Gospels with numerous lacunae, on 10+70 paper leaves. The text is written in two columns per page, 22 lines per page, in uncial letters. The leaves survived in a fragmentary condition. 

It contains texts Matthew 1-8; 21; 22,1-3; Mark 16:19; Luke 1-12; John 2; 10; 12; 13; 17; 20; 21.

Currently it is dated by the INTF to the 9th century.

Location 
It is one of the manuscripts discovered in Saint Catherine's Monastery at Sinai in May 1975, during the restoration work. 
Currently the codex is housed at the St. Catherine's Monastery (N.E. ΜΓ 97) in Sinai.

See also 

 List of New Testament uncials
 Biblical manuscript
 Textual criticism

References

Further reading 

 

Greek New Testament uncials
9th-century biblical manuscripts